Yevhen Zhuk (born 4 August 1990) is a Ukrainian handball player for GK Permskie Medvedi and the Ukrainian national team.

He represented Ukraine at the 2020 European Men's Handball Championship.

References

1990 births
Living people
Ukrainian male handball players
Sportspeople from Zaporizhzhia
Expatriate handball players
Ukrainian expatriate sportspeople in Russia
HC Motor Zaporizhia players
21st-century Ukrainian people